Edward Beversham Harman (September 1802 – 6 January 1866) was an Irish first-class cricketer and physician.

The son of Beversham Harman and Mary Connolly, he was born at Cork in September 1802. He was educated in Edinburgh, before going up to Trinity College, Dublin in 1820 where he studied medicine. He was admitted as a fellow in 1830 to Gonville and Caius College, Cambridge. Harman became the first graduate of Trinity College to play first-class cricket in 1837, when he played for the Marylebone Cricket Club (MCC) against Oxford University at Lord's in 1837. Batting twice in the match, he ended the MCC first innings unbeaten on 0, while in their second innings he was dismissed without scoring by Charles William Beauclerk. Harman practiced medicine in England at Bath and Midhurst. He later retired to Norfolk, where he died at Weeling in January 1866.

References

External links

1802 births
1866 deaths
Sportspeople from Cork (city)
Alumni of Trinity College Dublin
Fellows of Gonville and Caius College, Cambridge
Irish cricketers
Marylebone Cricket Club cricketers
19th-century Irish medical doctors